Peter Vogel (born 24 August 1952) is a former professional German footballer.

Vogel made a total of 14 appearances in the Fußball-Bundesliga for MSV Duisburg during his playing career.

References 
 

1952 births
Living people
German footballers
Association football forwards
Bundesliga players
2. Bundesliga players
MSV Duisburg players
Tennis Borussia Berlin players
20th-century German people